Kai Klefisch (born 3 December 1999) is a German professional footballer who plays as a midfielder for  club SC Paderborn.

Career
Klefisch made his 3. Liga debut for Viktoria Köln on 28 July 2019, coming on as a substitute in the 86th minute for Mike Wunderlich in the 3–2 home win against Chemnitzer FC.

On 14 March 2022, Klefisch signed a three-year contract with SC Paderborn, effective 1 July 2022.

References

External links
 
 
 Profile at kicker.de

1999 births
Living people
Sportspeople from Leverkusen
Footballers from North Rhine-Westphalia
German footballers
Association football midfielders
FC Viktoria Köln players
SC Paderborn 07 players
3. Liga players
Regionalliga players